The Catholic Youth Organization Sierra Leone (CYO Sierra Leone) is a Catholic youth organization in Sierra Leone. CYO Sierra Leone is a member of the Catholic umbrella of youth organizations Fimcap.

History
During the Ebola crisis in Western Africa in 2014 CYO Sierra Leone joined the fight against the Ebola virus by supporting quarantine homes. This initiative was supported by the 0.7% donation of the German partner organization of CYO Sierra Leone "Katholische junge Gemeinde".

References

Catholic youth organizations
Youth organisations based in Sierra Leone
Fimcap
Catholic Church in Sierra Leone